The Z17/18 Beijing-Harbin Through Train is a non-stop express train between Beijing and Harbin, capital of the Heilongjiang province, operated by Harbin Railway Bureau using 25T carriages. The 1242 km journey spans across almost the entire Beijing–Harbin railway. The train from Beijing railway station to Harbin West railway station is numbered Z17, with a journey time of 9 hours and 57 minutes; while the train in the opposite direction is numbered Z18, with a journey time of 10 hours and 15 minutes. It is also the second non-stop express train between Beijing and Harbin, after Z15/16.

Launch and development 
The train numbers Z17/18 were initially used on a route from Beijing to Changsha, which started service on 18 April 2004. This train was extended to Tianjin in 2015 and renumbered as Z206/7 and Z208/5.

In 2009, the only night trains between Harbin and Beijing were Z15/16 and T17/18, both facing high demand. As such, an additional pair of non-stop express train, numbered as Z1/2, was introduced in end 2009. One way journey took around 9 hours and 50 minutes. The train formation included 8 soft sleeper and 6 hard sleeper carriages, but this was changed to a full soft sleeper formation in 2010.

In 2016, the train swapped formation with Z203/4, another non-stop express train between Beijing and the province of Heilongjiang, giving its current formation mostly hard sleeper carriages. It was also renumbered as Z17/18.

In 2017, the train was amended to originate from and terminate at Harbin West railway station, as Harbin railway station undergoes renovation works.

Carriages
Currently, the train operates with mostly hard sleeper carriages, with a few soft sleeper carriages.

Locomotive 
After swapping formation with Z203/4, the HXD3D electric locomotive is utilised throughout the entire journey, with a stop at Shenyang North railway station for a change of drivers.

Schedule
Updated as of 10 April 2018.

See also 
Z15/16 Beijing-Harbin Through Train
Z203/204 Beijing-Harbin Through Train
D27/28 Beijing-Harbin Through Train
D101/102 Beijing-Harbin Through Train
G381/382 Beijing-Harbin Through Train
G393/394 Beijing-Harbin Through Train

References 

Passenger rail transport in China
Rail transport in Beijing
Rail transport in Heilongjiang